Albert Dupuis (1 March 1877 – 19 September 1967) was a Belgian composer.

Biography
Albert Dupuis was born in Verviers on 1 March 1877.
The son of a music teacher, Dupuis studied the finesses of the violin, the piano and the flute from the age of 8, at the conservatory in his hometown, Verviers, where  Guillaume Lekeu, composer of classical music, and Henri Vieuxtemps, composer and violinist, had also taken residence. Orphaned at age 15, he worked as a tutor at the Grand Theatre of Verviers while pursuing his studies, including from Francis Duyzings for harmony. As he was a brilliant and precocious student, he composed his first comic opera already at the age of 18.

Noticed by the French composer and teacher Vincent d'Indy in 1897, Dupuis was invited to work with him at the Schola Cantorum in Paris. He was for a time the coach of the choir of Saint-Eustache, but in 1900 he returned to Verviers to marry. In 1903 he won the Prix de Rome Belgium (not to be confused with the French Prix de Rome) with his cantata La Chanson d'Halewyn and on 5 March his opera Jean-Michel premiered at La Monnaie, the Royal Theatre of the Mint in Brussels..

Appointed conductor of the Theatre of Ghent in 1905, he withdrew when the season was completed, to devote himself to composition. But when in 1907 the council of Verviers offered him the post of director at the conservatory, he accepted and held it until his retirement in 1947.

During his lifetime, his works met with some success in Brussels and in the major cities in Belgium (particularly in Flanders) and France. In particular his opera La Passion, played more than 150 times at La Monnaie and he directed it several times. He also enjoyed the esteem of his peers, as Eugène Ysaÿe, dedicated of several of his works and who made his works known in the United States.

Legacy
Two of Dupuis' daughters, Gislène (cello) and Irene (violin), were eminent concert musicians. A street is named after him in the village of Stembert.

Characteristics of his works
He became a follower of the School of César Franck through his instructor d' Indy. Nevertheless, his style approaches much  de style of Gabriel Fauré and his music can be styled as impressionistic. He was essentially an opera composer (having composed fifteen), all his works are imbued with a lyrical feeling.

Major works
About twenty pieces for piano
 Suite champêtre (éd. Cranz, Bruxelles)
 Pièces paradoxales, 1923 (éd. Bayard-Nizet, Stavelot)
Two string quartets;
Two trios for strings, violoncello and piano
 Five pieces for strings and piano, among them:
 Sonate pour violon et piano, 1922 (éd. Senart, Paris)
 Eleven pieces for alto and piano
 Four pieces for violoncello and orchestra, among them:
 Concerto pour violoncelle (manuscrit)
 Légende, 1909
Six pieces for piano and orchestra, among them:
 Concerto pour piano
 Nine pieces for violin and orchestra, among them:
 Concerto pour violon
 Fantaisie rhapsodique, 1906 (éd. Schott, Bruxelles)
 More than thirty orchestral works, among them:
 two symphonies
 four Symphonic poems
 More than thirty melodies, among them:
 A collection of 12 melodies (éd. Schott, Bruxelles et éd. Katto, Bruxelles)
 Five cantatas, among them:
 La Chanson d’Halewyn (The Song of Halewyn), 1903 (éd. Eschig, Paris)
 Five oratorios
 Eight ballets
 Fifteen works for voice and orchestra
 Fifteen operas, among them:
 Jean-Michel, 1900 (éd. Breitkopf et Härtel, Leipzig)
 Fidélaine, 1908-1909 (éd. Breitkopf et Härtel, Leipzig)
 La Grande Bretèche, 1911-1912  (d’après Balzac) (éd. Eschig, Paris)
 La Passion, 1912-1914 (éd. Chouden, Paris)

Bibliography
 Dor (Jacques), Albert Dupuis, Notices biographiques et critiques, Imprimerie Bénard, Liège, 1935.
 La Grande Bretêche d’Albert Dupuis, Gazette de Cologne, 5 avril 1913
 R. Michel, Un grand musicien Belge méconnu, Albert Dupuis, Éditeur Cons. de musique,Verviers, 1967.

External links
 Médiathèque de Bruxelles Available discography
  Full scores of his works
  Full scores of his works

Selected works

Viola
 Aria for Viola and Piano or Orchestra
 Chanson affectueuse for Viola and Piano
 Chant d’adieu for Viola and Piano (1932)
 Chant du retour for Viola and Piano
 Chopin for Viola and Piano
 Evocation d’orient for Viola (or Violin) and Piano
 Grieg for Viola and Piano
 La jeune fille au rouet for Viola and Piano
 Méditation for Viola and Piano
 Mendelssohn for Viola and Piano (1933)
 Petite Variation for Viola and Piano
 Schumann for Viola and Piano

References

 Dor (Jacques), Albert Dupuis, Notices biographiques et critiques, Imprimerie Bénard, Liège, 1935.
 La Grande Bretêche d’Albert Dupuis, Gazette de Cologne, 5 April 1913

External links
 Recordings of some works on the Médiathèque of Brussels
 Scores : 1 2

Dupuis,Albert
Dupuis,Albert
Dupuis,Albert
1877 births
1967 deaths
People from Verviers
Schola Cantorum de Paris alumni
Prix de Rome (Belgium) winners